The 1973-74 French Rugby Union Championship was won by Béziers beating Narbonne in the final.

Formula 

The 64 clubs are divided in two groups.

 Group A with the 32 better of the previous season, divided in 4 pools of 8. The best 6 of each pools were qualified to knockout stages.
 Group B, with the other 32 teams, divided in 4 pools of 8. The first two of each pools were qualified to knock-on stage.

Qualification round

Group  A 

The clubs classified in the six first places of each pool  (24 clubs on 32) were qualified for the knockout stages.

The team are here listed in ranking order, in bold, the team qualified.

Group B

The clubs classified in the two first places of each pool (8 clubs on 32) were qualified for the knockout stages.

The teams qualified are here listed:

Knockout stages 

(Single match stage)

"Last 32" 
In bold the clubs qualified for the next round

"Last 16" 
In bold the clubs qualified for the next round

Quarter of finals 
In bold the clubs qualified for the next round

Semifinals

Final 

Narbonnw started very well, with two tries, a drop by Henri Cabrol, but Walter Spanghero and his fellow lost the title in the last seconds.

Béziers won the 3rd of six titles of a collection in the 1970s. Narbonne had to wait until 1979 to win his second "Bouclier de Brennus",

To remark that this was the final playerd in the new Parc des Princes.

External links
 Compte rendu finale de 1974 lnr.fr

1974
France 1974
Championship